The Top of New York is a lost 1922 American silent drama film directed by William Desmond Taylor and written by George James Hopkins, Julia Crawford Ivers and Sonya Levien. The film stars May McAvoy, Walter McGrail, Pat Moore, Edward Cecil, Charles Bennett, and Mary Jane Irving. The film was released on June 18, 1922, by Paramount Pictures, four months after director Taylor's murder, and was the last one he completed.

Cast 
May McAvoy as Hilda O'Shaunnessey
Walter McGrail as Emery Gray
Pat Moore as Micky O'Shaunnessey
Edward Cecil as Gregory Stearns
Charles Bennett as	Mr. Isaacson
Mary Jane Irving as Susan Gray
Carrie Clark Ward as Mrs. Brady
Arthur Hoyt as Mr. Brady

References

External links 

 
 
 Progressive Silent Film List: The Top of New York at silentera.com

1922 films
1920s English-language films
Silent American drama films
1922 drama films
Paramount Pictures films
Films directed by William Desmond Taylor
Films with screenplays by Sonya Levien
Lost American films
American black-and-white films
American silent feature films
1922 lost films
1920s American films